The women's doubles of the 2005 ECM Prague Open tournament was played on clay in Prague, Czech Republic. 

This event was last held in 1998.

Émilie Loit and Nicole Pratt won the title.

Seeds

Draw

References

External Links
 Main Draw

2005 Women's Doubles
2005 in Czech women's sport